Afghanistan participated at the 2018 Summer Youth Olympics in Buenos Aires, Argentina from 6 October to 18 October 2018.

Medalists

Athletics

Boxing

Taekwondo

Afghanistan qualified one competitor in the +73 kg event of the taekwondo.

References

2018 in Afghan sport
Nations at the 2018 Summer Youth Olympics
Afghanistan at the Youth Olympics